Bjarte Baasland (born 5 March 1974) is a former Norwegian businessman and convicted fraudster.

He became famous in Norway in connection with the Baasland case in the autumn of 2008, when it was revealed that he had gambled away almost  (more than €7 million) that he borrowed from family friends and banks. He is the son of Ernst Baasland, who at the time was a Bishop of Stavanger in the Church of Norway. A consequence of the Baasland case was that Ernst Baasland resigned as Bishop and went personally bankrupt along with his wife, Bodhild Baasland, who is also under investigation for fraud. On 2 October 2009, Bjarte Baasland was convicted of fraud and sentenced to 4 years in prison and to return NOK 26,6 million to one of his creditors, Cecilie Nustad. Baasland fooled mainly his mother to lend him money for business projects. She borrowed money from banks, her husband, and her close friend Cecilie Nustad.

References

21st-century Norwegian criminals
Norwegian male criminals
Norwegian businesspeople
Norwegian fraudsters
1974 births
Living people
People convicted of fraud